The American Society of Clinical Hypnosis is a professional organization based in Bloomingdale, Illinois, dedicated to the use of hypnosis in clinical settings. Founded by Milton H. Erickson in 1957, ASCH (American Society of Clinical Hypnosis) is the largest U.S. organization for health and mental health care professionals using clinical hypnosis. Their "members are psychologists, psychiatrists, clinical social workers, marriage and family therapists, mental health counselors, medical doctors, master's level nurses and dentists", according to the ASCH website.

The goals of ASCH include: providing continuing education for professionals using hypnosis, raising public awareness of the benefits of hypnosis and dispelling of the many myths regarding hypnosis. Though geared toward already degreed professionals, they also admit students and interns working toward their educational and professional goals.

ASCH offers three levels of workshop training (Basic, Intermediate and Advanced) four to six times per year. In addition, ASCH holds an annual scientific meeting and workshops on clinical hypnosis. All workshops conform to ASCH's Standards of Training, which ensures that participants receive quality, comprehensive training. ASCH administers a program that offers non-statutory voluntary credentialing in clinical hypnosis.

ASCH also publishes the American Journal of Clinical Hypnosis (AJCH). The journal publishes original, peer-reviewed scientific research and case studies on clinical hypnosis.

For members, they have a clinical video library showing hypnosis in live settings and educational material on hypnosis in a professional setting.

See also
Hypnotherapy
British Society of Clinical Hypnosis

References

External links
 ASCH website
 https://www.linkedin.com/company/american-society-of-clinical-hypnosis

Medical and health organizations based in Illinois
Hypnosis organizations
Health care-related professional associations based in the United States
1957 establishments in the United States